The Bitola inscription is a stone inscription from the First Bulgarian Empire written in the Old Church Slavonic language in the Cyrillic alphabet. Currently, it is located at the Institute and Museum of Bitola, North Macedonia among the permanent exhibitions as a significant epigraphic monument, described as "a marble slab with Cyrillic letters of Ivan Vladislav from 1015/17". In the final stages of the Byzantine conquest of Bulgaria Ivan Vladislav was able to renovate and strengthen his last fortification, commemorating his work with this elaborate inscription. The inscription found in 1956 provided strong arguments supporting Bulgarian character of Samuil's state, disputed by the Yugoslav scientists.

History

Finding 

The inscription was found in Bitola in 1956 during the demolition of the Sungur Chaush-Bey mosque. The mosque was the first mosque that was built in Bitola, in 1435. It was located on the left bank of the River Dragor near the old Sheep Bazaar. The stone inscription was found under the doorstep of the main entrance and it is possible that it was taken as a building material from the ruins of the medieval fortress. The medieval fortress was destroyed by the Ottomans during the conquest of the town in 1385. According to the inscription, the fortress of Bitola was reconstructed on older foundations in the period between the autumn of 1015 and the spring of 1016. At that time Bitola was a capital and central military base for the First Bulgarian Empire. After the death of John Vladislav in the Battle of Dyrrhachium in 1018, the local boyars surrendered the town to the Byzantine emperor Basil II. This act saved the fortress from destruction. The old fortress was located most likely on the place of the today Ottoman Bedesten of Bitola.

Decryption
After the inscription was found, information about the plate was immediately announced in the city. It was brought to Bulgaria with the help of the local activist Pande Eftimov. A fellow told him that he had found a stone inscription while working on a new building and that the word "Bulgarians" was on it. The following morning, they went to the building where Eftimov took a number of photographs which were later given to the Bulgarian embassy in Belgrade. His photos were sent to diplomatic channels in Bulgaria and were classified. In 1959, the Bulgarian journalist Georgi Kaloyanov sent his own photos of the inscription to the Bulgarian scientist Aleksandar Burmov, who published them in Plamak magazine. Meanwhile, the plate was transported to the local museum repository. At that time, Bulgaria avoided publicising this information as Belgrade and Moscow had significantly improved their relations after the Tito–Stalin split in 1948. However, after 1963, the official authorities openly began criticizing the Bulgarian position on the Macedonian Question, and thus changed its position.

In 1966, a new report on the inscription by Vladimir Moshin, a Russian emigrant living in Yugoslavia, was published. As a result Bulgarian scientists Yordan Zaimov and his wife, Vasilka Tapkova-Zaimova, travelled to Bitola in 1968. At the Bitola Museum, they made a secret rubbing from the inscription. Zaimova claims that no one stopped them from working on the plate in Bitola. As such, they deciphered the text according to their own interpretation of it, which was published by the Bulgarian Academy of Sciences in 1970. Finally, the Macedonian researcher Ugrinova-Skalovska published her translation of the inscription in 1975.

Text 
In its current state, the following text is visible on the stone:

Text reconstructions

Part of the text is missing, as the inscription was used as a step of the Sungur Chaush-Bey mosque and therefore the first row was destroyed. The reconstruction of the Macedonian scientist prof. Radmila Ugrinova-Skalovska is very similar to the reconstruction made by the Yugoslav/Russian researcher Vladimir Moshin (1894–1987), and the Bulgarian Prof. Yordan Zaimov (1921–1987). With some conjectures made by Zaimov to reconstruct the damaged parts, their version of the text reads as follows:

Alternative views 

The professor Horace Lunt, promoted the idea that the plate might have been made during the reign of Ivan Asen II ca. 1230, or that the inscription might be composed of two pieces, lettered at different times. His findings are based on the photos, as well as the latex mold genuine reprint of the inscription, made by the professor Ihor Sevchenko of Dumbarton Oaks, unlike the approach of Zaimovs, that created the re-print copy of the left over text, with special paper and water, when they visited Bitola in 1968. Professor Lunt  notes, that the Zaimov's arguments are inaccurate, stating that there are no reliable set of criteria to date early South Slavic Cyrillic. He quotes Moshin, that the date on the inscription is worn away and therefore Moshin and Zaimov "restored" most of the text inaccurately. In order for Moshin and Zaimov to restore the year of Ѕ ҃Ф ҃К ҃Г ҃ (6522–1014), they were missing the clear evidence of existence of those numbers (letters). Lunt notes that the letter " ҃Ф" (that stands for 500), can also be a "ѱ" (that stands for 700), this number is followed by a space in which the letter "M" (that stands for 40) can be fitted in, therefore the final dating of the year according to Lunt, can be 1234 – the period of the Bulgarian ruler Ivan Asen II and not Ivan Vladislav. Lunt, who is called a midwife of the Macedonian language, supports also the alternative theory that Samuel was a Macedonian king, who ruled a separate Macedonian state, with distinct Slavic Macedonian population. Lunt was funded by the authorities of Yugoslavia and the Socialist Republic of Macedonia for his work.

One of the latest approach of this problem insists also on possible pre-dating. On the 23th International Congress of Byzantine Studies, (held in 2016), two archeologists: Elena Kostić and the Greek prof. Georgios Velenis, who worked on the field with the plate itself found out that, on the very top part of the plate there were holes and channels to fit Π-shaped metal joints. Therefore, the plate could not have the 13th row (which was made-up by the Zaimov couple) and that it was more likely that the plate was part of much older object from the Roman period. Based on the form of the used letters, they are giving a date close to that of Lunt, i.e. 1202–1203, when Kaloyan was Bulgarian ruler. Though, both authors have summarized, most of the researchers believe that the inscription is the last written source of the First Bulgarian Empire with an accurate dating, while some others argue it is from the 13th century, and only a single study proclaims it as a forgery. Some modern researchers from North Macedonia also deny the dating of the inscription, claiming the existence of the contemporary Bulgarian ethnic identification was impossible, knowing that often time Byzantines, whilst also disputing the original size of the inscription, the titles of the rulers inside the text, the specific way of invoking the saints’ help, its authenticity, etc., insisting Vladislav was Macedonian tsar.

Criticism 
The few researchers presenting the thesis that the inscription was from the time of the Second Bulgarian Empire (based on one unreadable date in the first case, and on the specific form of the letters in the second) do not give an explanation of where the Bulgarian ruler at that time, had detailed information about some events from end of the First Bulgarian Empire. It is about the kinship of the Comitopuli, as well as on some historical battles. It is not clear why this Bulgarian ruler called Ivan, who according to them was not Ivan Vladislav, claimed to be the grandson of Comita Nikola and Ripsimia of Armenia, and son of Aron of Bulgaria, who was Samuel of Bulgaria's brother.

Significance 

During the 10th century the Bulgarians established a form of national identity, that despite far from modern nationalism, helped them to survive as a distinct entity through history. The inscription confirms that Tsar Samuel and his successors considered their state Bulgarian. The stone plate reveals, the Cometopuli also had incipient Bulgarian ethnic consciousness. The proclamation announced the first use of the Slavic title "samodŭrzhets", that means "autocrat". The name of the city of Bitola, is mentioned for the first time in the inscription. The Bitola inscription is a constructional one – it announces the reconstruction of a fortress. The text contains valuable information about the genealogy of the ruler Ivan. It becomes clear from it, that this ruler was the grandson of Nicholas and Ripsimia and the son of Aaron, Samuel's brother. The inscription also mentions the victory of the Bulgarians over the Byzantine emperor Basil II at the Trayanovi Vrata pass in 986, and the defeat of Samuel in the battle near the village of Klyuch in 1014. The inscription indicates that in the 10-11th century, the patron saints of Bitola were the Holy Virgin and the Twelve Apostles.

In North Macedonia, the official historiography refers to John Vladislav as one of the first Macedonian Tsars, and ruler of the "Slavic Macedonian Empire", but there is no historical support for such assertions. Moreover, the stone definitively reveals the ethnic self-identification of the last ruler of the First Bulgarian Empire before its conquest by Byzantium. 
Even, according to Ugrinova-Skalovska, the claim on his Bulgarian ancestry is in accordance with the Cometopuli's insistence, to bound their dynasty to the political traditions of the Bulgarian Empire. Per Skalovska, all Western and Byzantine writers and chroniclers at that time, called the inhabitants of their kingdom Bulgarians. The mainstream academics support the view that the inscription is an original artefact, made during the rule of Ivan Vladislav.

Controversy 

The inscription was found in SR Macedonia, then part of SFR Yugoslavia, where for political reasons any direct link between the Cometopuli and the First Bulgarian Empire was denied. Originally exhibited in the local museum, the stone was locked away in 1970, after Bulgarian scientists made a rubbing and published a book on the inscription. Immediately after this publication, a big Bulgarian-Yugoslav political scandal arose. The museum director was fired for letting such a mistake happen. After the collapse of Yugoslavia, the stone was re-exposed in the medieval section of the museum, but without any explanation about its text. The historical and political importance of the inscription was the reason for another controversial event in the Republic of Macedonia in 2006 when the French consulate in Bitola sponsored and prepared a tourist catalogue of the town. It was printed with the entire text of the inscription on its front cover, with the word Bulgarian clearly visible on it. News about that had spread prior to the official presentation of the catalogue and was a cause for confusion among the officials of the Bitola municipality. The French consulate was warned, the printing of the new catalogue was stopped and the photo on the cover was changed. In 2021, a team of Bulgarian television made an attempt to shoot the artifact and make a film about it. After several months of waiting and the refusal of the local authorities, the team complained to the Ministry of Foreign Affairs in Sofia. A protest note was sent from there to Skopje, and only then  the journalists have received a permission for working in Bitola.

Footnotes

References 
 Божилов, Иван. Битолски надпис на Иван Владислав // Кирило-методиевска енциклопедия, т. І, София, 1985, с. 196–198. 
 Бурмов, Александър. Новонамерен старобългарски надпис в НР Македония // сп. Пламък, 3, София, 1959, 10, с. 84–86. 
 Заимов, Йордан. Битолски надпис на Иван Владислав, старобългарски паметник от 1015–1016 // София, 1969. 
 Заимов, Йордан. Битолският надпис на цар Иван Владислав, самодържец български. Епиграфско изследване // София, 1970. 
 Заимов, Йордан. Битольская надпись болгарского самодержца Ивана Владислава, 1015–1016 // Вопросы языкознания, 28, Москва, 1969, 6, с. 123–133. 
 Мошин, Владимир. Битољска плоча из 1017. год. // Македонски jазик, XVII, Скопје, 1966, с. 51–61 
 Мошин, Владимир. Уште за битолската плоча од 1017 година // Историја, 7, Скопје, 1971, 2, с. 255–257 
 Томовић, Г. Морфологиjа ћирилских натписа на Балкану // Историјски институт, Посебна издања, 16, Скопје, 1974, с. 33. 
 Џорђић, Петар. Историја српске ћирилице // Београд, 1990, с. 451–468. 
 Mathiesen, R. The Importance of the Bitola Inscription for Cyrilic Paleography // The Slavic and East European Journal, 21, Bloomington, 1977, 1, pp. 1–2. 
 Угринова-Скаловска, Радмила. Записи и летописи // Скопје, 1975, 43–44. 
  Lunt, Horace. On dating Old Church Slavonic bible manuscripts. // A. A. Barentsen, M. G. M. Tielemans, R. Sprenger (eds.), South Slavic and Balkan linguistics, Rodopi, 1982, p. 230.
 Georgios Velenis, Elena Kostić, (2017). Texts, Inscriptions, Images: The Issue of the Pre-Dated Inscriptions in Contrary with the Falsified. The Cyrillic Inscription from Edessa.

See also 

 Macedonian Question
 Macedonism

11th century in Bulgaria
11th-century inscriptions
1956 archaeological discoveries
Medieval Macedonia
Old Bulgarian inscriptions
Inscriptions in medieval Macedonia
Bitola